Bukkanodus jesseni is a species of prehistoric lobe-finned fish which lived during the Early Devonian period (Pragian stage, about 407 to 411 million years ago). B. jesseni was first described in 2007 by paleontologist Zerina Johanson in the Journal of Paleontology from specimens found in the Fairy Formation of Victoria, Australia.

A new phylogenetic analysis of sarcopterygians placed Bukkanodus outside of the Onychodontiformes as a stem-actinistan basal to the Onychodontiformes+Coelacanthiformes clade.

References 

Onychodontida
Monotypic fish genera
Prehistoric lobe-finned fish genera
Devonian bony fish
Prehistoric fish of Australia
Devonian Oceania
Fossil taxa described in 2007